Grand Falconer may refer to:

 Grand Falconer of France
 Hereditary Grand Falconer of England, title of the Duke of St Albans

See also
Falconry